Preston Street may refer to:

Preston Street (Ottawa)
Preston Street (Baltimore)
A section of Kentucky Route 61